Jan Howard is the seventh studio album released by American country music artist Jan Howard. The album was released in June 1969 on Decca Records and was produced by Owen Bradley. The album spawned three singles, including the major hit "My Son". The album would also reach peak positions on the Billboard country chart upon its release.

Background and content
Howard's eponymous studio album was recorded at Bradley's Barn, located in Mount Juliet, Tennessee. It was recorded in three sessions during 1968, a year before its official release. The album's tracks were produced by Owen Bradley, whom Howard had been collaborating with since signing with the Decca label. The album contained 10 tracks, many of which were written by other songwriters and artists. This included several tracks written by Bill Anderson, such as "Happy State of Mind" and "I Still Believe in Love". The album also included Gordon Lightfoot's "Ribbon of Darkness" and Dallas Frazier's "Until My Dreams Come True". The fifth track, "My Son", was written entirely by Howard and was originally a letter written to her son fighting in the Vietnam War. Howard's son would later be killed in battle before the song had become a major hit. The record's liner notes included a commentary by Bill Anderson. In his message, Anderson thanks Howard for their professional relationship and friendship. He also praises the tracks "My Son" and "When We Tried".

Release and reception
Jan Howard was officially released in June 1969 via Decca Records on a vinyl record format. The vinyl edition included 5 tracks on both sides of the record. The album reached number 25 on the Billboard Country Albums chart in July 1969. The album also included three singles, one of which became a major hit in the United States. The first single issued was "I Still Believe in Love", which peaked at number 27 on the Billboard Hot Country Singles chart. The second single was Howard's self-written "My Son", which became a major hit, reaching number 15 on the Billboard country singles chart. "When We Tried" was the album's final single, peaking at number 24 on the country singles chart. Additionally, "I Still Believe in Love" and "My Son" would charted on Canada's RPM Country Tracks chart. "I Still Believe in Love" became a major hit on the RPM country chart, reaching number 8 in 1968.

Track listing

Personnel
 Bill Anderson – liner notes
 Owen Bradley – producer
 Jan Howard – lead vocals, background vocals

Chart performance

Release history

References

1969 albums
Jan Howard albums
Albums produced by Owen Bradley
Decca Records albums